The Alaska Loyal League was a small group of Fairbanks businessmen who were instrumental in supporting early Tanana Valley agriculture and enterprise. They included: A. Browning; George Coleman, manager of the Northern Commercial Company; F.S. Gordon, a merchant; H.B. Parkin, Fairbanks Meat Company transportation agent; E.R. Peoples, merchant; Harry E. St. George, real estate agent; William Fentress Thompson, editor and publisher of the Fairbanks Daily News-Miner; and R.C. Wood, a banker.

In April 1917, the League hosted a Farmers' Day lunch and convention, for the purpose of organizing area agriculturalists and making the valley agriculturally self-sufficient. They were behind the formation of a short-lived Farmers Bank, the Tanana Valley Agriculture Association, and later a Flouring Mill Corporation.

References
 Like a Tree to the Soil: A history of farming in Alaska's Tanana Valley, 1903 to 1940. 2007. Josephine E. Papp and Josie A. Phillips. University of Alaska Fairbanks.

Agriculture in the United States
Agriculture in Alaska
Pre-statehood history of Alaska